Jorge Eduardo Recalde Ramírez (born May 8, 1992 in Asunción, Paraguay) is a Paraguayan footballer currently playing for Club Olimpia in the Primera División in Paraguay.

Career
Jorge debuted in the senior team in a friendly match against Costa Rica national football team in March 2014.

Career statistics

References

External links
 
 

1992 births
Living people
Paraguayan footballers
Paraguay under-20 international footballers
Association football forwards
Club Libertad footballers
Club Olimpia footballers
Paraguayan Primera División players